Schelle is also the German name for Šaľa, Slovakia.

Schelle is a municipality located in the Belgian province of Antwerp. The municipality only comprises the town of Schelle proper. In 2021, Schelle had a total population of 8,559. The total area is 7.80 km².

Notable people 
 Hugo Coveliers (born 1947), retired Belgian politician and lawyer
 Felix De Smedt (1923–2012), judoka who is credited with introducing the sport to Belgium.

Gallery

References

External links
 
  Official website

Municipalities of Antwerp Province
Populated places in Antwerp Province